The National Union of Journalists (NUJ) is a trade union for journalists in the United Kingdom and Ireland. It was founded in 1907 and has 38,000 members. It is a member of the International Federation of Journalists (IFJ).

Structure

There is a range of national councils below the NEC, covering different sections and areas of activity. There is an industrial council for each of the NUJ's "industrial" sectors – Newspapers and Agencies, Freelance, Magazine and Book, Broadcasting, New Media and Press and PR.

There are also national Executive Councils, covering all sectors, for Ireland and Scotland. The Irish Executive Council, which has a higher degree of autonomy, covers Northern Ireland as well as the Republic.

The union's structure is democratic and its supreme decision-making body is its Delegate Meeting, a gathering of elected delegates from all branches across the UK, Ireland and Europe.

Between meetings, decisions lie with the NUJ's National Executive Council, a committee of 27 people, elected annually by members. The NEC is chaired by a President, elected, along with a Vice-President and Treasurer, at the Annual Delegate Meeting.

The General Secretary (GS) is elected every five years by a national ballot of all members. The current GS is Michelle Stanistreet.

The General Secretary is responsible for the day-to-day running of the union and directing its staff. However, important decisions such as authorising industrial action must be taken by the NEC.

Leadership

General Secretaries

Presidents 
Presidents of the NUJ:

Publications

The NUJ publishes a magazine called The Journalist.

See also

Journalism
Trade union

References

External links
National Union of Journalists website
Catalogue of the NUJ archives, held at the Modern Records Centre, University of Warwick

Trade unions in the United Kingdom
International Federation of Journalists
1907 establishments in the United Kingdom
Organisations based in the London Borough of Camden
Organizations established in 1907
United Kingdom journalism organisations
Irish journalism
Journalists' trade unions
Trade unions based in London
Trade unions affiliated with the Trades Union Congress